Cangrejeros de Santurce, Spanish for "Santurce Crabbers", refers to several teams based in San Juan, Puerto Rico:

 Cangrejeros de Santurce (baseball), baseball team of the Puerto Rico Baseball League
 Cangrejeros de Santurce (basketball), basketball team of the Baloncesto Superior Nacional league